The Pontiac Aztek is a mid-size crossover SUV marketed by General Motors from model years 2001 until 2005, along with a rebadged variant, the Buick Rendezvous.

As a 5-door crossover with a front engine with front-wheel drive and optional all-wheel drive, the Aztek featured a four-speed automatic transmission with a V-6 engine. Marketed by Pontiac as a "sport recreational vehicle,"  the Aztek used a shortened platform shared with GM's minivans (e.g., the Pontiac Montana) featuring 94 cubic feet of cargo room with its rear seats removed.  The design employed conventional rear outswing doors rather than sliding doors and a bi-parting rear tailgate, the lower section formed with seat indentations and cupholders. Other features included a front center console that doubled as a removable cooler, Optional  rear stereo controls in the cargo area, optional sliding cargo floor with grocery compartments and optional camping package with an attachable tent and air mattress.

The Aztek was noted for its controversial styling. Pulitzer Prize-winning automotive journalist Dan Neil, in naming it one of the 50 worst cars of all time, said the Aztek "violate(d) one of the principal rules of car design: we like cars that look like us. With its multiple eyes and supernumerary nostrils, the Aztek looks deformed and scary, something that dogs bark at and cathedrals employ to ring bells.  The shame is, under all that ugliness, there was a useful, competent crossover."

Original concept
First shown to the public in 1999, the Pontiac Aztek concept car was well received. It featured "Xtreme" futuristic styling and promised maximum versatility in support of a young and active lifestyle for its intended "Generation X" buyer demographic.

The Aztek went on sale in summer 2000 as a 2001 model.

The production edition of the Aztek was launched with the tagline "Quite possibly the most versatile vehicle on the planet" in conjunction with CBS's hit reality show Survivor in 2000.

Styling

The Aztek was styled under the direction of Tom Peters, who would later design the Chevrolet Corvette (C7). According to an analysis in 2000, BusinessWeek said the Aztek was to signal a design renaissance for GM, and to "make a statement about breaking from GM's instinct for caution." One designer said that during the design process, the Aztek was made "aggressive for the sake of being aggressive." Peters, the Chief Designer said "we wanted to do a bold, in-your-face vehicle that wasn't for everybody." The 2000 Business Week study said the Aztek was "the first awkward step toward innovation by a company that has avoided that path," likening "the debacle to Ford's remodeling of its 1996 Taurus sedan."

Ultimately, the Aztek was criticized for its styling. Mickey Kaus described the Aztek as having "awkwardly empty and square front wheel wells" and a "gratuitous, fierce animalistic snout, which may have been what prompted incoming GM executive Bob Lutz to famously say that many of the company's products looked like 'angry kitchen appliances.  James Hall, vice-president at  AutoPacific Inc ranked the Aztek as one of the ten ugliest cars of all time, Karl Brauer, CEO and editor-in-chief of TotalCarScore.com said the Aztek featured "atrocious proportions wrapped in plastic body cladding," and "looked like a station wagon stretched out by a car bomb."

A poll in The Daily Telegraph in August 2008 placed the Aztek at number one of the "100 ugliest cars" of all time.   An article by Edmunds.com placed the car first of the "100 Worst Cars of All Time" not only because of its styling but also because it "destroyed an 84-year-old automaker." Time magazine in 2007 named the Aztek one of the 50 worst cars of all time (adding that underneath "was a useful, competent crossover"), and again in 2010 as one of the 50 worst inventions of all time.

Technology and notable features
The Aztek was produced at General Motors' Ramos Arizpe, Mexico, assembly plant, where it shared an assembly line with the Buick Rendezvous.  In Canada, it filled the gap left since the Sunrunner's discontinuation in 1997, while in the US and Mexico it was the first Pontiac-badged SUV ever sold. At launch, the Aztek was available with either front-wheel drive or Versatrak, a full-time, fully automatic all-wheel drive system which provided traction in the snow or rain and could handle moderately rough off-road surfaces.

The Aztek was one of the first automobiles to be designed entirely using computerized rapid-prototyping/rapid-visualization tools. The dashboard was designed by Johnson Controls, and featured Pontiac's trademark red lighting scheme along with an optional heads-up display.

Options included a center console that doubled as a removable cooler and a tent/inflatable mattress package that, along with a built-in air compressor, allowed the Aztek to double as a camper. Extending this image was a seat-back mounted backpack, and a number of specialty racks for bicycles, canoes, snowboards, and other such items. An optional 10 speaker Pioneer stereo system provided a set of controls located at the rear of the vehicle for tail-gate parties as well as an unusual 2-piece tailgate with built-in cup-holders and contoured seating area for added comfort.

Safety
The Insurance Institute for Highway Safety (IIHS) gave the Aztek a Marginal overall score in the frontal offset test.  However, they did not conduct a side-impact test.

2004 National Highway Traffic Safety Administration (NHTSA) Crash Test Ratings:

Frontal Driver: 
Frontal Passenger: 
Side Driver: 
Side Rear Passenger:

Sales

Reception
GM forecast sales of up to 75,000 Azteks per year and needed to produce 30,000 annually to break even. Just 27,793 were sold in 2002, which was the model's best-selling year.

Pricing of the Aztek was also an issue at launch: the vehicle was too expensive for its intended "Generation X" audience and was priced significantly higher than competing vehicles. After the 2001 model year, the GT model was dropped and pricing was slashed, in addition to extremely generous rebates and cut-rate financing instituted by GM in the wake of the terrorist attacks on September 11, 2001.

The Aztek had among the highest CSI (Customer Satisfaction Index) scores in its class, and won the appellation of "Most Appealing Entry Sport Utility Vehicle" in 2001 from J.D. Power and Associates, an independent consumer survey organization which noted: "The Aztek scores highest or second highest in every APEAL component measure except exterior styling."

Matthew DeBord of The Big Money argued that despite its poor reviews and sales, the Aztek was the car that, in the long run, could save GM. He praised GM for being daring and trying to create an entirely new market in vehicles, rather than simply copying successful formulas. He argued that the Aztek's failure is similar to the failure of the Apple's Newton and Mac Portable – two failed products that revolutionized the computer industry and became the basis for later successful products made by Apple.

The car was featured through a tie-in in the sci-fi show Dark Angel in 2000–02. Walter White, the lead character of the 2008 crime TV show Breaking Bad, drove an Aztek. Jalopnik called it "one of the perfect examples of car casting in TV" and noted that the show had White's Aztek repainted in a unique "gray-beige-green tone" to match White's character's original job as a mild-mannered high school chemistry teacher. In 2015, Edmunds ranked the Aztek sixth among U.S. used car buyers aged 18 to 34, crediting the "Breaking Bad Effect" for making the car cool.

The Aztek's "Design by Committee" was criticized in Steve McConnell's software design book, Code Complete 2.

Year to year changes

2001

 All new model available as base model and GT both in front-wheel drive and all-wheel drive, the latter boasting an independent rear suspension.
 In February 2001, a red Aztek served as the pace car for the Daytona 500.

2002

Cladding smoothed and changed to body colored, front marker light/indicators changed from amber to clear, spoiler added to rear glass gate.
GT model discontinued.

2003

Aztek "Rally Edition" introduced, which was an option package which featured a lowered front suspension, a larger rear spoiler, body colored grille and 17-inch chrome wheels.  Though some regarded it as a model of its own, since it would resurface the Rally name to GM since the discontinuation of the GMC Rally.
DVD entertainment system, XM satellite radio and a tire pressure monitoring system added to the options list.

2004

A CD/MP3 player became an available option.
A Limited Edition model was available, with standard leather trimmed seats, a higher grade stereo system, a rear spoiler, aluminum interior trim, standard heads-up display, and an adjustable 6-way driver's seat.

2005

In its final model year, the Aztek gained hands-free operation of its On-Star system. Exterior color offerings also changed.

The Aztek was discontinued after the 2005 model year, and was replaced by the Theta platform Pontiac Torrent. The Aztek's production line in Ramos Arizpe, Mexico, was retooled to build the Chevrolet HHR, although Buick Rendezvous production continued for another two years. The last Pontiac Aztek finally rolled off the assembly line on August 31, 2005.

References

External links

 Bob Lutz tells the inside story

Aztek
Aztek
Cars introduced in 2000
Crossover sport utility vehicles
Mid-size sport utility vehicles
Front-wheel-drive vehicles
All-wheel-drive vehicles